The Cormorant-class gunvessels (sometimes known as Eclipse-class gunvessels) were a class of 4-gun first-class gunvessels built for the Royal Navy in the 1860s. They were somewhat unsuccessful; intended for shore bombardment in shallow water, they exceeded their design draft by 50%. Seven of the 13 ships ordered were suspended, with 3 finished or converted as survey ships and the other 4 cancelled. Racehorse was wrecked after only 4 years, and those ships that were completed as planned had short operational lives, in some cases less than 10 years. The survey vessels (Myrmidon, Sylvia and Nassau) lasted longest, with the last ship of the class, Sylvia, being broken up in 1890.

Design

Propulsion
The first 6 ships had a 2-cylinder horizontal single-expansion steam engine provided by Robert Napier and Sons and rated at 200 nominal horsepower, driving a single screw. Sylvia and Nassau were completed as survey ships and were powered by 150 nhp Humphreys and Tennant engines. Myrmidon received a more powerful 200 nhp Humphreys and Tennant engine.

Armament
The main armament, which was principally intended for shore bombardment, was originally designed with two 68-pounder and two 32-pounder muzzle-loading smoothbore guns. They were finished, however, with a single 7-inch/110-pounder Armstrong breech-loading gun and a 68-pounder muzzle-loading smoothbore gun. A pair of broadside 20-pounder Armstrong breech-loading guns were also fitted. The 68-pounders were later replaced by a pair of 64-pounder muzzle-loading rifled guns.

Sail plan
In common with all other Royal Navy wooden screw gunvessels, the Cormorants were rigged as barques, that is with three masts, with the fore and main masts square rigged, and the mizzen fore-and-aft rigged.

Construction
The first 6 ships were ordered from commercial yards (Money Wigram & Sons, C J Mare & Co and J Scott Russell), with fitting out to be done in the Royal Dockyards at Chatham (first pair) and Woolwich (last 4). A further batch of 4 ships (Sylvia - Myrmidon) were ordered on 5 March 1860 and another batch of 3 (Pegasus - Guernsey) on 25 March 1862. Since gunvessels were intended to work in shallow water while bombarding the shore, work on the later two batches was suspended. Sylvia, Nassau and Myrmidon were suspended in 1862 or 1863, but were resumed, with Sylvia and Nassau being finished as survey vessels. Tartarus was broken up on the slipway in 1865, having cost £6,268 and work to Pegasus cost only £339. Guernsey was never laid down.

Ships

References and sources
References

Sources
Bastock, John (1988), Ships on the Australia Station, Child & Associates Publishing Pty Ltd; Frenchs Forest, Australia. 

1860 ships
Gunvessels of the Royal Navy
Victorian-era gunboats of the United Kingdom